Stella Crawford is a fictional character from the BBC soap opera EastEnders, played by Sophie Thompson from 7 September 2006 to 23 July 2007.

The character's story arc revolves on her relationship with established character Phil Mitchell (Steve McFadden), during which she mentally and physically abuses his son Ben (Charlie Jones) for months in the build-up to her and Phil’s wedding.
On the day of the wedding, Ben's ordeal is finally discovered causing Stella to flee with Phil giving chase, determined to make her pay for what she has done to his son; this culminates in Stella being killed-off when she commits suicide by jumping off a roof to her death.

Storylines
Stella Crawford is a lawyer who soon ends up working for Phil Mitchell (Steve McFadden), the local hardman of Albert Square. They begin dating but Phil's son Ben (Charlie Jones) is unhappy about it. Stella moves in with them and Ben tries breaking them up. Stella tricks him into trusting her, and attempts to end his friendship with classmate Abi Branning (Lorna Fitzgerald). After some time, Stella begins physically and mentally abusing Ben. She later forces Ben to get Phil to propose to her, and lies that she has taken a job in Manchester. Phil proposes and she accepts. She continues tormenting Ben by calling him names, pinching him and manipulating him to confess to things he has not done. She also convinces him that he caused a car accident that he and Phil were involved in. Ben then goes to football camp during the school holidays, upsetting Stella. Ben returns, and Stella creeps into his room and tells him she loves him, knowing Phil is listening outside. This finalizes Phil's feelings towards her and he is determined to marry for Ben. Ben tells Abi what is happening, but he believes it is a normal part of growing up that will happen to her too. The pair try to run away from home, but Stella stops them. She smashes a photo of Ben's deceased mother Kathy Beale (Gillian Taylforth), and says he is too pathetic to be Phil's real son. Abi later realises what Stella is doing and stands up to Stella.

On the day of Phil and Stella's wedding day, Ben tells Stella he does not want her to be his mother and Stella threatens Ben – warning him to keep quiet. During the ceremony, Ben confesses what Stella has been doing to him. Stella runs home, spills orange juice on Ben's bed and takes a picture of Phil and Ben, tearing Phil out and keeping the piece with Ben tucked in her bra. Ben's half-brother, Ian Beale (Adam Woodyatt), sees Stella in shock; she lies to Ian by claiming that she has discovered something out about Phil. Moments later, Phil bursts into The Queen Vic and Ian tells Stella to go. She takes the car again and Phil follows her to an abandoned factory, where she locks the gates so Phil cannot get to her. Stella says that in her childhood, she was always blamed for her sister's death and she felt like she was a ghost in her own home and she feels the same with Phil – and that when she feels like in a dream she sometimes has to pinch herself to wake herself up. Phil, reasoning that Stella is insane, drives his car into the gates and runs after her onto the roof. She threatens to jump off unless Phil says he loves her. Phil answers that he chose her because he thought she was "easy", "safe", and would "look after Ben, iron [his] shirts and keep [her] mouth shut for the next 30 years". Stella looks down from the roof and then jumps, killing herself instantly. Phil publicly declares that he killed her at The Queen Vic and is arrested for murder, but CCTV shows that she jumped.

In January 2012, local shopkeeper Denise Fox (Diane Parish) is led to believe that Phil had murdered her husband Kevin Wicks (Phil Daniels) in late December 2007. Denise later suspects that Phil pushed Stella to her death on their wedding day, but Phil denies her accusations and insists that Stella committed suicide. However, Denise goes to the police, telling them she believes that Phil murdered Stella. Ben (now played by Joshua Pascoe) goes to the police and tells police detective DCI Jill Marsden (Sophie Stanton), who has been trying to imprison Phil for years, that Phil forced Stella to jump – telling her that if she did not, then he would shove her instead. Phil is then arrested for Stella's murder and is later charged, but Marsden is forced to release him when Ian reveals to her that Ben had lied about Phil murdering Stella.

Creation and development
 In July 2007, the entertainment website Digital Spy interviewed Sophie Thompson about the basics of her character Stella. She revealed that even though her character is a very nasty piece of work, nobody has shouted any comments to her on the street. She commented: "I've been pleasantly surprised. Occasionally you get the odd kid laughing and pointing but it's not been unpleasant at all. I've been amazed by the amount of post you get up at Elstree and how thoughtful the correspondence is. It's really nice to read a letter and see how people become engaged and involved in the storylines and want to have a good yarn about them!"

Stella was created solely as a love interest for the character Phil Mitchell. When Steve McFadden, who plays Phil, returned to the show in October 2005, a story conference was held between the show's producers, who decided that his relationship with his son Ben would take priority over any new love interests. Another story conference was held in February 2006, where it was decided to introduce a new love interest. EastEnders''' series story producer, Brigie de Courcy, said; "To create her, we took all of Phil's past lovers and came up with somebody completely different from them!"

Producers created a "wish list" of actresses they wanted to see. The EastEnders casting director offered the role to Sophie Thompson, who accepted. Producers were so excited that the whole office cheered when they found out that Thompson had accepted the role. Thompson has said of the role that "joining EastEnders is a bit like being welcomed into a really special playground that you never thought you had the chance to play in, and you are rather in awe of all the kids, but very excited."

 Personality 
When she was first introduced, Stella appeared to be a scatterbrained but well-meaning character who lived on her own and had developed something of a drink problem when Phil first met her. She dryly comments on this, saying "You're getting a basic picture of a spinster here, aren't you? You're probably wondering if I've got any cats." However, as the show went on and her relationship with Phil's son, Ben, was explored, it became clear that Stella was a deranged and mentally unstable character, who psychologically and physically abused Ben whilst manipulating him in her attempts to improve her relationship with his father. Supposedly, Stella's instability is a result of parental neglect. This is hinted at by her telling Ben that his friend Abi Branning was an unpleasant and untrustworthy person, probably as a result of poor parenting. Later in the same episode, she picks up a Mother's Day picture that she did with Ben and glares at the word "Mother" before later tearing up the card. It is known that something ghastly happened to Stella's sister for which her parents blamed her. However, it is never revealed what happened to her or how, or if it was Stella's fault. This is later confirmed to be true when she tells Phil Mitchell that as a child she was ignored by her parents and felt like a ghost within her own home.

Stella, at times, gives the impression of being emotionally immature, a frequent side-effect of parental neglect. An interview with Sophie Thompson says that Charlie Jones who plays Ben mused that her vicious nature is caused by the fact that she had a very unhappy childhood.

ReceptionRadio Times'' included Stella in their feature on bunny boilers. They stated that anyone who falls in love with Phil needs "their head examined". They added that she was manipulative and "proved to be a basket-case".

See also
List of EastEnders characters (2006)
List of soap opera villains
List of suicides in fiction

References

External links
Stella Crawford BBC Online

EastEnders characters
Fictional lawyers
Television characters introduced in 2006
Female characters in television
Fictional suicides
Fictional child abusers
Female villains
Fictional criminals in soap operas
Fictional characters with psychiatric disorders
Fictional torturers